The Los Angeles City School District was a school district that served Los Angeles, California, and some adjoining areas between 1870 and 1961.

History
The district was formed on May 2, 1870, with the same boundaries as the city of Los Angeles. In 1890 the Los Angeles City High School District was formed to serve high school students.  The Los Angeles City School District and various other feeder elementary school districts served elementary and junior high students.

The elementary school district annexed various elementary school districts during its existence. The annexations include:
 April 17, 1896: Harmony and Rosedale
 February 26, 1906: McKinley
 1907
 January 22: Green Meadows and Sunnyside
 February 25: Gardena
 April 8: Howard and Moneta
 1909
 August 7: Lincoln, San Pedro, and Wilmington
 August 27: Dominguez
 November 8: Cahuenga
1910
 February 21: Hollywood
 February 28: Los Felis
 March 7: Coldwater-Lankershim and Laurel
1912
February 1: Mt. Washington-Washington Park
February 9: American and Annandale
March 25: Belvedere
July 8: Miramonte
1915
June 1: Chatsworth Park, Pacoima, and Van Nuys
June 22: Farmdale
July 12: Morningside and San Fernando
1917
July 30: Cienega
August 27: Vineland
1918
March 11: National
April 22: Hansen Height
1921
August 8: Russell
October 27: Sawtelle
1923
May 17: Eagle Rock
June 18: Hyde Park
November 15: Graham
May 4, 1925: Watts
1926
August 23: Monte Vista and Venice City
December 6: Bell and Maywood
1927
May 18: San Antonio
May 23: Playa del Rey
December 19: Palomar
January 23, 1928: Vernon City
February 20, 1929: Tujunga
August 31, 1931: Tweedy
January 18, 1932: Huntington Park

The Palos Verdes Peninsula region was formerly in the Los Angeles city district. However that area seceded effective January 26, 1925, when the Palos Verdes School District was established.

Torrance was originally in the district; Sam Gnerre of The Daily Breeze wrote that "As early as the 1920s, the city had expressed unhappiness over being allied with LAUSD." Dr. J.S. Lancaster created a campaign to establish a school district in the mid-1920s, but the first two formal referendums on secession, on April 11, 1932 and March 16, 1937, respectively, failed on 1,346-572 and 932-378 bases. However on August 20, 1946, Torrance voters did approve a new city charter, 1,371-761, which allowed for a new district to be created. Torrance seceded in 1947 and created a new school district, which in 1948 became the Torrance Unified School District (TUSD). The Los Angeles City School District removed all of the furniture from the Torrance elementary and middle schools; Gnerre wrote that "LAUSD was not pleased with the outcome of the election."

The elementary school district disappeared on July 1, 1961, when it became a unified school district, the Los Angeles Unified School District. The change of the Los Angeles City and the Palos Verdes School District into being unified school districts left the Topanga School District and the Las Vergenes Union School District as separate remnants of the high school district, renamed to the West County Union High School District.

References

Former school districts in California
History of Los Angeles
Education in Los Angeles
Education in Torrance, California
1870 establishments in California
School districts established in 1870